Salisbury United Football Club is a soccer club from Salisbury, South Australia.  Salisbury play in the National Premier Leagues State League 1. Their home ground is at Steve Jarvis Park, Waterloo Corner, Burton.

Honours
 State League Champions: 1991; 2008; 2011
 1st Division Champions: 1985
 1st Division Runner-Up: 1987; 1991
 2nd Division Champions: 1983
 2nd Division Cup Champions: 1982
 3rd Division Champions: 1955; 1976
 3rd Division Runner-Up: 1968
 West End Cup Champions: 1984
 Coca-Cola Cup Champions: 1991

References

Soccer clubs in Adelaide
Soccer clubs in South Australia
Association football clubs established in 1954
1954 establishments in Australia